Tim George Jr. (born December 21, 1980) is an American professional stock car racing driver.

Personal life and early career
George was born on Manhattan's Upper East Side in 1980 as the son of investment banker Timothy M. George. George Sr. is the treasurer of the Philharmonic-Symphony Society of New York, Inc. (aka the New York Philharmonic) and founded the Potomac Family Dining Group, which owns several Applebee's franchises. He also served as an executive for JPMorgan Chase and Goldman Sachs.

George began his racing career in 2005. Employed at the time as a chef in a New York–based Italian restaurant, he was catering at a sports-car racing event at the road course at Lime Rock Park in Connecticut, and when he was criticized by the head chef for having modified a recipe, he took a break to watch the cars race. He soon enrolled in racing school, and first competed in the 2005 Skip Barber Racing School Southern Series. He raced in the Grand-Am Rolex Sports Car Series for TRG Motorsports in 2007 and 2008, winning the 2008 Rookie of the Year award and one race, at New Jersey Motorsports Park, before moving to full-time stock-car racing. He is single.

Stock car career
Though only completing two events in the actual NASCAR series, George competed in the ARCA Racing Series starting in 2008, driving at first for TRG Motorsports, then for Eddie Sharp Racing before joining Richard Childress Racing at the start of the 2010 season. He scored his first win in the series at Pocono Raceway in a rain-shortened event in the summer of 2011, leading only the last two laps before the race was called due to rain, darkness, and fog. He finished seventh in season points in 2011, his best career points finish in the ARCA Racing Series.

George made occasional starts in the NASCAR-sanctioned Nationwide Series and Camping World Truck Series during the 2009, 2010 and 2011 seasons. His first start in the Truck Series was at Phoenix International Raceway in 2009, and his first Nationwide Series start was at Road America in 2010. He attempted to qualify for the 2011 season-ending Ford 200 in the Camping World Truck Series, driving for RCR in conjunction with Eddie Sharp Racing, but failed to qualify when time trials were rained out.

George competed part-time in the Camping World Truck Series for Richard Childress Racing in 2012, driving for the team's with Applebee's sponsorship in twelve races over the course of the season. After finishing 22nd in points, he returned to the series in 2013, driving for Wauters Motorsports.

Images

Motorsports career results

NASCAR
(key) (Bold – Pole position awarded by qualifying time. Italics – Pole position earned by points standings or practice time. * – Most laps led.)

Nationwide Series

Camping World Truck Series

K&N Pro Series East

 Season still in progress
 Ineligible for series points

ARCA Racing Series
(key) (Bold – Pole position awarded by qualifying time. Italics – Pole position earned by points standings or practice time. * – Most laps led.)

24 Hours of Daytona 
(key)

References

External links
 
 

Living people
1980 births
Sportspeople from Manhattan
Racing drivers from New York City
24 Hours of Daytona drivers
NASCAR drivers
ARCA Menards Series drivers
Rolex Sports Car Series drivers
Richard Childress Racing drivers